Millbrook is a village in Kendall County, Illinois, United States. It was incorporated on November 5, 2002, and had a population of 335 at the 2010 census.

The village is part of the Chicago metropolitan area.

Geography
Millbrook is in western Kendall County on the southeast side of the Fox River. The village is bordered to the northeast by Silver Springs State Fish and Wildlife Area, along the Fox River.

Demographics

Points of interest
 Silver Springs State Fish and Wildlife Area
 Winding Creek Nursery                          
 Farnsworth House
 Millbrook United Methodist Church

References

External links
Official website

Villages in Kendall County, Illinois
Villages in Illinois
Populated places established in 2002
2002 establishments in Illinois